The Mizur  Formation is a geological formation that outcrops in North Ossetia–Alania in the North Caucasus, representing a series of marginal marine to coastal layers with terrestrial influence. It is of Late Pliensbachian (Lower Jurassic) age. It is notable as the only major unit with preserved dinosaur footprints of various orders not yet ascribed to any concrete ichnogenus.

Stratigraphy

Fytyn Member
The Fytyn member represent the older layers of the formation, and depending on the outcrop, it overlies the eroded surface of Paleozoic granites or crystalline schists, or the Sinemurian–lower  Pliensbachian  volcanosedimentary rocks of the Sadon Formation. This member is composed mostly of the product of the regional erosion of older layers — conglomerates, gravelstones, quartz sandstones, and others — that were deposited in a mostly continental setting. It is up to a few dozen meters thick.

Faraskat Member
In some outcrops the Fytyn Member is absent, as result of a regional uplift, with the sedimentary material transported from this area to central parts of the Greater Caucasus. Such material ended up accumulating on the Kistin Formation (Sinemurian–lower Pliensbachian), a unit that underlies in some sections the Faraskat Member. The Faraskat section began its deposition when the local layers were accompanied by a slow subsidence of the land and sedimentation on the previously denuded area. The Faraskat sequence represents the first proper coastal deposit in the unit and is composed by a mixture of coarse material, as well as wood fragments and siderite, with some layers being highly bioturbated.

Mizur Member
The transition between the Faraskat and Mizur members is gradual, forming a large sedimentary cycle from clayey to sandstone-dominated rocks. This layer represents the last unit of the formation and is dominated by fine-grained sandstone horizons, often low-angle crossbedding and scarce fine ripple marks, in contrast to the abundant large wave ripples. This layers have abundant fragments of terrestrial vegetation in a highly oxidized state. This layer is the only that has provided dinosaur footprints, as well ammonites and other invertebrates.

Environment
The Mizur Member contains numerous fragments of plants — stems, wood, and  leaves — suggesting a clear influence of nearby emerged settings. The vegetation in the coeval exposures along the Caucasus and adjacent regions were covered by coniferous forests with abundant underliying Bennettitales. The spores and pollen in the sediments are dominated by bennettitales, which likely grew on nearshore lowlands. The region hosts pollen of several plant groups, notably the Pinaceae, Podocarpaceae, Araucariaceae, with other such as Ginkgoaceae being less common. Beyond trees, the lowlands were covered by thermophilic ferns (Cibitium, Mattonia, Coniopteris), lycophytes (Selaginella), and horsetails (Neocalamites). Invertebrate faunas are linked with the Mediterranean faunal region, with isotope ratios in some specimens (belemnites and brachiopods) yielding estimated average annual temperatures in the North Caucasian–Transcaucasian region of 21.4–23.5 °C; that is, a subtropical humid climate.

Fossil content

Ammonites

Dinosauria

See also 
 List of fossiliferous stratigraphic units in Russia
 Sorthat Formation, Denmark
 Neringa Formation, Lithuania
 Pliensbachian formations
 Blanowice Formation, Southern Poland
 Clarens Formation, South Africa
 Fernie Formation, Canada
 Hasle Formation, Denmark
 Kota Formation, India
 Los Molles Formation, Argentina
 Mawson Formation, Antarctica
 Rotzo Formation, Italy
 Whiteaves Formation, British Columbia
 Navajo Sandstone, Utah
 Kandreho Formation, Madagascar
 Kota Formation, India
 Cattamarra Coal Measures, Australia

References 

Geologic formations of Russia
Jurassic System of Asia
Jurassic Russia
Pliensbachian Stage
Sandstone formations
Coal formations